The Boxing Tournament at the 1994 Asian Games was held in Naka Ward Sports Center, Hiroshima, Japan from October 4 to October 13, 1994.

Medalists

Medal table

Participating nations
A total of 141 athletes from 24 nations competed in boxing at the 1994 Asian Games:

Results

48 kg

51 kg

54 kg

57 kg

60 kg

63.5 kg

67 kg

71 kg

75 kg

81 kg

91 kg

+91 kg

References
Amateur Boxing

 
1994 Asian Games events
1994
Asian Games
1994 Asian Games